Will McCants (born 1975), also known as William Faizi McCants, is a scholar of militant Islamism. He is a fellow at the Center for Middle East Policy and director of the Project on U.S. Relations with the Islamic World at the Brookings Institution.  An adjunct faculty member at Johns Hopkins University, he is a former senior advisor on violent extremism to the U.S. State Department's Office of the Coordinator for Counterterrorism. Founder and co-editor of the website Jihadica, he is also a former research analyst for CNA, a non-profit organization that encompasses the Center for Naval Analyses and the Institute for Public Research.

Career
Described by William Maclean, the security correspondent for Reuters, as "a leading scholar of militant Islamism", McCants is author of a 2011 book titled Founding Gods, Inventing Nations: Conquest and Culture Myths from Antiquity to Islam, based on his doctoral research at Princeton University.

McCants is co-editor of Jihadica.com, which The Economist described as "a respected website".

Books

References

External links
Jihadica

Princeton University alumni
Johns Hopkins University faculty
Living people
1975 births
Place of birth missing (living people)